South Dakota Adventure is an educational television series about the state of South Dakota.  The program was hosted by Richard Muller and was produced from 1980 to 1984 by South Dakota Public Television.  Each of the thirty-two episodes is just under fifteen minutes in length.

Episode list
101  South Dakota: Land of Infinite Variety 
102  Prehistoric Dakota 
103  Early Indians of South Dakota 
104  The Sioux Peoples 
105  Tiyospaye 
106  Indian Wisdom and Beliefs 
107  White Culture Arrives in South Dakota 
108  Louisiana Purchase 
109  Fur Trading 
110  The Military Comes to South Dakota 
111  Early Day Tourists 
112  Dakota Settlement 
113  Sioux Nationalism 
114  The Reservation System 
115  The Great Dakota Boom 
116  Black Hills Gold Rush 
117  Life In and Around the Black Hills 
118  Territorial Government 
119  Pioneer Entertainment 
120  Statehood 
121  Your State Government 
122  South Dakota Enters the 20th Century 
123  The Thirties 
124  South Dakotans Serve Their Country  
125  South Dakotans Serve Country -II 
126  Education 
127  Conservation and Ecology 
128  South Dakota's Natural Resources 
129  Recreation and Tourism 
130  Famous South Dakotans 
131  What South Dakota Produces 
132  South Dakota: Yesterday, Today, Tomorrow

References

External links
South Dakota Adventure page at the SDPB website.
South Dakota Adventure teacher's resource
Richard Muller recalls the lasting impact of his SOUTH DAKOTA ADVENTURE program

Television series about the history of the United States
Local children's television programming in the United States
1980 American television series debuts
1984 American television series endings
1980s American children's television series
South Dakota television shows